Pictures from an Institution: a Comedy is a 1954 novel by American poet Randall Jarrell.  It is an academic satire, focusing on the oddities of academic life, in particular the relationships between the characters and their private lives. The nameless narrator, a Jarrell-like figure who teaches at a women's college called Benton, makes humorous observations about his students and his fellow academics; especially the latter, and in particular the offensively tactless novelist Gertrude, modeled on Mary McCarthy.

Some believe Benton was modeled after Sarah Lawrence College, where Jarrell taught but in an interview with the New York Times, Jarrell stated that "Benton is supposed to be just a type ... I've taken things from real places, but mostly have made them up".

Characters
 Unnamed narrator, a professor of literature
 Gertrude Johnson, a visiting novelist
 President Robbins, a former Olympic diver
 Gottfried Rosenbaum, composer in residence
 Constance, a longtime friend of the narrator, a beautiful music student

Awards
Pictures from an Institution was a finalist for the National Book Award.

References

External links
 An excerpt from the book at the University of Chicago Press.
 New York Times review by Orville Prescott (1954)

1954 American novels
Satirical books
Campus novels
Alfred A. Knopf books